"Chemical World" is a song by English alternative rock band Blur, included on their second album, Modern Life Is Rubbish (1993).

Tracks
The single was released in the UK on 7-inch and 12-inch vinyl and two CDs. CD1 and the 12-inch featured the reworked demo version while CD2 and the 7-inch featured the Stephen Street version (in edited form on the 7-inch). The 12-inch and CD2 feature three exclusive tracks "Young & Lovely", "Es Schmecht" and "My Ark". "Young & Lovely" was hailed as one of the greatest "lost tracks" by Q in 2007.

CD1 features three tracks recorded live at Glastonbury Festival 1992. The song "Never Clever" had not been previously released. It was originally intended as the follow-up to Blur's fourth single, "Popscene". However, the commercial death of "Popscene" prompted those plans to be abandoned. The studio version of "Never Clever" was eventually released on a promo CD to celebrate Food Records' 100th release in 1997.

The 7-inch vinyl has a cover version of Rod Stewart's "Maggie May", which had been recorded for and was first released on Ruby Trax, a 1992 triple album compilation of cover versions issued by the NME on its 40th birthday. It was also featured on Blur's The Special Collectors Edition in 1994 along with "Es Schmecht".

Release
"Chemical World" was released on 28 June 1993 as the second single from Modern Life Is Rubbish, equalling their previous release "For Tomorrow" at number 28 in the UK Singles Charts. In the United States, the song reached number 27 on the Modern Rock Tracks chart, becoming the only single from the album to chart there.

The song was commissioned by Blur's American record label, SBK Records, to increase the album's appeal for the American market. The first version shown to SBK was a demo produced by the band. It was then re-recorded in a version produced by Stephen Street. This version was used for the UK version of the album but SBK preferred the demo which was 'reworked' by producers Clive Langer and Alan Winstanley and used for the US album. Although originally never labelled as such (with only the producer credits on the sleeves and labels showing which version is used), this version is now known as "Chemical World (Reworked)" which is how it appeared since the 1999 singles box set.

The single cover features a red Ferrari F40 and a mustang against a background of the Brooklyn Bridge and the Manhattan skyline. The music video shows the band in a grassy field surrounded by wildlife. On Beavis and Butt-head, when the video was reviewed, Beavis said that he wanted to urinate all over the band and the wildlife, including a snail and Damon Albarn. "Chemical World" did not appear on the 2000 greatest hits compilation Blur: The Best Of but was included on the 2009 compilation Midlife: A Beginner's Guide to Blur.

Track listings
All music was composed by Albarn, Coxon, James and Rowntree. All lyrics were written by Albarn except where noted.

7-inch
 "Chemical World" (radio Edit) – 3:54
 "Maggie May" (Rod Stewart and Martin Quittenton) – 4:05

12-inch
 "Chemical World" (reworked) – 3:46 (uncredited on sleeve that it is the reworked demo version)
 "Es Schmecht" – 3:38
 "Young & Lovely" – 5:04
 "My Ark" – 5:58

CD1 (live tracks from Glastonbury Festival 1992)
 "Chemical World" (reworked) (uncredited on sleeve that it is the reworked demo version)
 "Never Clever" (live) (Blur (music and lyrics))– 2:28
 "Pressure on Julian" (live) – 5:00
 "Come Together" (live) – 3:30

CD2
 "Chemical World" (radio edit) – 3:54
 "Young & Lovely" – 5:04
 "Es Schmecht" – 3:38
 "My Ark" – 5:58

Personnel
 "Chemical World" and "Young & Lovely" produced by Stephen Street
 "Es Schmecht" produced by Blur
 "My Ark" produced by Blur and John Smith
 "Maggie May" produced by Steve Lovell
 "Chemical World" (Reworked) produced by Blur, Clive Langer and Alan Winstanley
 Damon Albarn: lead vocals
 Graham Coxon: guitar, backing vocals
 Alex James: bass guitar
 Dave Rowntree: drums

Charts

References

Blur (band) songs
1993 singles
1993 songs
Song recordings produced by Stephen Street
Songs written by Alex James (musician)
Songs written by Damon Albarn
Songs written by Dave Rowntree
Songs written by Graham Coxon